Jamia Salafia, Faisalabad is an Islamic education institution in Faisalabad.

Notable alumni
 Hafiz Abdul Salam bin Muhammad

References

Faisalabad